Bette S. Garber (November 18, 1942 – November 13, 2008) was an American photojournalist known for her fashion photographs and pictures of customized semi-trucks. She worked for Heavy Duty Trucking Magazine and published several books.

Formative years
Garber was born in Chicago on November 18, 1942. She attended the University of Illinois and earned a bachelor's degree of English in 1964. After college, she worked as a copywriter and married Charles Garber.

Career
In 1970, Garber and her husband founded Structure Probe, an electron microscopy company. Working for their company, she was often on the road. During the mid-1970s, she purchased a CB radio to enable her to obtain traffic reports. The CB radio also picked up trucker communications and conversations and it was this that first sparked her interest in the world of big trucks. She began taking pictures of the trucks she encountered, and then also started writing stories about the trucks and their drivers, which she submitted to trucking magazines. Eventually, she left Structure Probe, and for the next thirty years, devoted herself full-time to her passion for trucking photojournalism.

Death
Garber died in Philadelphia from pneumonia at the age of sixty-five on November 13, 2008.

Publications
 Custom Semi Trucks. MBI Publishing Company, 2003.
 Big Rigs. MBI Publishing Company, 2004.
 Custom Semi. MBI Publishing Company, 2005.
 Ultra-Custom Semi Trucks. MBI Publishing Company, 2008.

References

External links 

 Bette S. Garber Photographs. General Collection, Beinecke Rare Book and Manuscript Library, Yale University.

1942 births
2008 deaths
American photojournalists
Deaths from pneumonia in Pennsylvania
American women journalists
American women photographers
20th-century American women artists
20th-century American people
21st-century American women
Women photojournalists